Brian Rowland (born December 30, 1980) is a Canadian retired soccer player who was a goalkeeper in both the indoor and outdoor versions of the sport. He is currently the head coach for the Temple Owls men's soccer team.

Career

College
Born in Toronto, Ontario, Canada, Rowland played college soccer at the University of Maryland, Baltimore County (UMBC), where he was a four-year starter between 1999 and 2002. In 2002, he earned first team All-America East Conference, and was named an All-America honorable mention. He graduated with a bachelor's degree in economics in 2003.

International
Rowland was a member of the U20 Canadian National Team, the U19 Eastern Canadian regional team and the U20 Ontario Team. He played in a friendly match for Manchester United while on trial there, trained with Everton, and Fulham, and played a couple of first team games for Halifax Town as a triallist in 1998 and 1999.

During the 2001 and 2002 Rowland also played for the Chesapeake Dragons in the Premier Development League.

Professional
Rowland turned professional upon his graduation from college in 2003, and played for his hometown club Toronto Lynx in 2003 and 2004. Rowland also has extensive indoor soccer experience, having spent time playing for Baltimore Blast, the California Cougars and Milwaukee Wave.

Rowland signed with Crystal Palace Baltimore in 2007, and has been the team's first choice goalkeeper since then, helping the team to the USL-2 postseason for the first time in 2008. He became an assistant coach for the University of Maryland men's soccer team when he retired as an active player on February 15, 2010.

Coaching
After retiring from playing, Rowland was an assistant coach for the Maryland Terrapins men's soccer team for eight years, serving as the Associate Head Coach 2015–17. On December 22, 2017, he was named head coach of the Temple Owls of the American Athletic Conference.

Personal
A native of Toronto, Ontario, Rowland earned his bachelor's degree in economics from UMBC in 2003. Rowland holds a USSF A License (2012) and is involved with US Soccer as a scout for their Youth National Teams.

Since 2004 Rowland has run a goalkeeper specific training camp named "Rowland Keeper Academy."

Career statistics

Head coaching record

Notes

References

External links
 Crystal Palace Baltimore player profile
 Temple Owls bio

1980 births
Association football goalkeepers
Baltimore Blast (2001–2008 MISL) players
California Cougars players
Canadian expatriate sportspeople in the United States
Canadian expatriate soccer players
Canadian soccer players
Canadian people of English descent
Chesapeake Dragons players
Crystal Palace Baltimore players
Expatriate footballers in England
Expatriate soccer players in the United States
Halifax Town A.F.C. players
Living people
Major Indoor Soccer League (2001–2008) players
Milwaukee Wave players
Soccer players from Toronto
Toronto Lynx players
UMBC Retrievers men's soccer players
A-League (1995–2004) players
USL League Two players
USL Second Division players
Temple Owls men's soccer coaches
Canadian expatriate sportspeople in England
Canadian soccer coaches
Indoor soccer goalkeepers
Maryland Terrapins men's soccer coaches